Karen Louise Wilson  (born 1950) is an Australian botanist.

Some of her research interests are: systematics, phylogenetic and biogeographic studies on Cyperaceae, Casuarinaceae, Juncaceae and Polygonaceae. Other professional interests include botanical nomenclature; botanical history, biodiversity,  informatics and scientific editing.

From 1973 to the present she has worked at the Royal Botanic Gardens, National Herbarium of New South Wales, Australia. Wilson graduated from the University of New South Wales with an MSc in 1986.

Names published 
She has published at least 105 species names according to APNI, while IPNI records some 107.
Gymnanthera fruticosa  K.L.Wilson (Gymnanthera cunninghamii) J. Adelaide Bot. Gard. 10(1): 113 (1987).
Rhyncharrhena linearis (Decne.) K.L.Wilson, Telopea 2(1): 38 (1980).
Baumea johnsonii K.L.Wilson, Telopea 1(6): 457 (1980).
(incomplete)

See also Taxa named by Karen Louise Wilson

Publications 
(incomplete)

Journal articles
 
 Rye, B.L., Barrett, R.L., Barrett, M.D., Bruhl, J.J., Clarke, K.L., Wilson, K.L. (2015) Five new species and a new combination in Cyperaceae from the Kimberley region of Western Australia.  Nuytsia 26: 167-184. PDF.

Thomson, S.A. et.al. (2018)

Books
Karen L. Wilson and David A. Morrison (eds.) (1998) (1998) Monocots : systematics and evolution

Honours
In 2008, she received an AM (member of the Order of Australia) in the Queen's Birthday Honours for services to botany as a researcher and for  the recording and documentation
of Australian biodiversity.
The citation lists the following achievements and services:

In addition she was a member of the organising committees for regional workshops on  Global Taxonomy Initiative of
Convention on Biological Diversity, a convenor of the Committee on Electronic Publishing and Databasing, International
Association for Plant Taxonomy (1993-2005), a convenor of the International Conference on ‘Comparative Biology of
the Monocotyledons’, Sydney (1998)  co-editing the proceedings, and more.

References 

1950 births
Living people
Members of the Order of Australia
University of New South Wales alumni
Australian Botanical Liaison Officers